Vander Veer may refer to:

Albert Vander Veer (1841-1929), an American surgeon
Emily A. Vander Veer, an author 
Vander Veer Park Historic District in Davenport, Iowa, United States
Vander Veer Botanical Park, a botanical garden in the above historic district

See also
Van der Veer (disambiguation)